The black sittella (Daphoenositta miranda) is one of two species of birds in the family Neosittidae.
It is found in endemic to New Guinea, where it is found in the highlands.

References

 del Hoyo, J.; Elliot, A. & Christie D. (editors). (2007). Handbook of the Birds of the World. Volume 12: Picathartes to Tits and Chickadees. Lynx Edicions. 

black sittella
Birds of New Guinea
black sittella
Taxonomy articles created by Polbot
Endemic fauna of New Guinea